The Information Operations Roadmap is a document commissioned by the Pentagon in 2003 and declassified in January 2006. The document was personally approved by former Secretary of Defense Donald Rumsfeld, and describes the United States Military's approach to Information operations, with an emphasis on the Internet.

The operations described in the document include a wide range of military activities: Public affairs officers who brief journalists, psychological operations troops who try to manipulate the thoughts and beliefs of an enemy, computer network attack specialists who seek to destroy enemy networks, and a major disinformation project to plant false stories in any available news media.

See also
 Computer network operations
 Electronic warfare
 Military deception
 Operations security
 Propaganda
 Psychological operations (United States)
 Psychological warfare
 PSYOP
 War on Terrorism

References

External links
 PDF of this document
 Information Operations Roadmap (PDF)
 US plans to 'fight the net' revealed, BBC News, January 27, 2006

 
2003 documents
Psychological warfare
Counterterrorism
United States Department of Defense publications
Counterterrorism in the United States
Propaganda in the United States
Disinformation operations